The Institut de recherche criminelle de la gendarmerie nationale (IRCGN) is the forensic science department of the French National Gendarmerie.

References

See also 
 Institut national de police scientifique

Forensics organizations
Law enforcement agencies of France